Jonathan Tsao is a Canadian politician and a former councillor in the city of Toronto in Ward 33 (Don Valley East).

As a longtime community activist, Tsao was appointed as Toronto city councillor. He was a resident of Ward 33 at the time of his appointment. He represented Don Valley East, which was vacant as a result of the resignation of the incumbent councillor Shelley Carroll in April 2018 and served until the municipal election in October 2018 when he did not seek re-election.

He is a former senior political advisor in the Ontario provincial government. He currently serves as a director of the Yee Hong Centre for Geriatric Care and on the board of management for the Toronto Zoo.

In October 2020, Tsao was selected as the Ontario Liberal Party's candidate for Don Valley North for the 43rd Ontario general election.

Education
Tsao holds a bachelor's degree from University of Toronto, and an MSc from the London School of Economics.

References

External links
 Councillor Jonathan Tsao

21st-century Canadian politicians
Toronto city councillors
Living people
1987 births